is a Japanese former AV idol, nude model, and film and television actress. Starring in more than 600 adult films between 2002 and 2011, Aoi is widely considered one of the most famous AV idols of the 2000s, with her popularity as an adult video actress leading to celebrity status as a media personality both in Japan and abroad.

Life and career

Early life and AV debut
Sora Aoi was born on April 26, 1981, in Kanagawa. As a student, she worked at various part-time jobs in the food-service industry, such as pizza parlors, pubs and sushi bars with the intent of becoming a pre-school teacher. While in her third year in high school, Aoi was scouted in Shibuya by a talent agency for gravure modelling. She decided to enter the adult entertainment industry with the aim of eventually working on TV and in other parts of the entertainment industry, stating that "If there was only the AV industry, I couldn't do it."

When asked how her stage name was chosen, Aoi explained: "My agency asked what color I liked. I said blue [aoi in Japanese]. He also asked what I like in general. I said sky [sora in Japanese]. So, he chose Aoi Sora."

Aoi appeared as a gravure idol in the June 2002 issue of Bejean and then made her debut in adult videos (AV) at age eighteen in July 2002, with Happy Go Lucky! for the Alice Japan studio, part of the Kuki Inc. group which was one of Japan's largest producers of pornography at the time. The next month, she appeared in the AV The Blue Sky on the Samansa label for the Max-A studio, also part of the Kuki group. For her video appearances in 2002, Aoi was awarded the Second Place Award as Best New Actress in the 2002 X City Grand Prix Awards. Aoi continued making videos for both Alice Japan and Max-A for almost two-and-a-half years until late 2004.

While continuing to perform in hardcore AVs, Aoi also appeared in the first video release of the Shuffle company's new label Believe. Entitled The Naked Body, this June 2003 release was an "image video", which has nude modeling but features no sex.

Into mainstream entertainment 
During this period, Aoi also started making appearances in mainstream media. In May 2003, she had a role in the theatrical release Gun Crazy 4: Requiem for a Bodyguard and from July to December 2003, Aoi had a role in the TV Asahi J-dorama Tokumei Kakarichō Tadano Hitoshi. For her starring role in the pink film, released to theaters in July 2004, Aoi was given a Best Actress Award at the 2004 Pink Grand Prix ceremony. The film was ranked the fourth-best pink film release of the year.

Aoi also starred in the October 2004 release of the manga-based theatrical thriller Stop the Bitch Campaign: Hell Version. According to one reviewer of the June 2007 DVD release of the film: "The acting proves that Sora Aoi is no Dame Judi Dench but she is winsome enough to make you believe and care for her."
 
In November 2004, Aoi left Alice Japan and Max-A to move to the newly formed studio, S1 No. 1 Style, part of the large Hokuto Corporation. Her first video for S1, Sell Debut, was directed by Hideto Aki and released on November 11, 2004. Aoi continued making about one video a month for S1 until mid-2006. By this time, Aoi had become one of the most popular AV idols in Japan. Her name was the second most popular internet search on a female celebrity in Japan for 2005.

Aoi's popularity enabled her to enter further into mainstream entertainment, including film, television and radio. In early 2005, she starred as a high-school girl in director Keisuke Yoshida's film . The romantic comedy, released theatrically in Japan in January 2005, won the Grand Prize in the Off Theater Competition at the 2006 Yubari International Fantastic Film Festival where it was screened in February 2005. Along with another AV idol, Akiho Yoshizawa, Aoi appeared in the late-night TV Tokyo manga-based production  which aired in 12 episodes from October to December 2005. Aoi later returned in a special guest appearance for the 2009 sequel to the show .

In another venue, Aoi was one of several AV actresses asked by a small Japanese publisher to take photographs of themselves as "if the [toy] cameras [were] their boyfriends or undetestable stalkers". The result, Polgasun Aoisora, was warmly received by a reviewer for the journal European Photography, who wrote, "It would appear that in Polgasun she is trying to swap the wretchedness and banality of the pornography genre for intimacy and authenticity."

By 2006, Aoi was appearing regularly on television, often appearing on variety shows and acting in several dramas including the 2006 midnight-drama Shimokita GLORY DAYS (下北GLORY DAYS) along with fellow S1 actresses Yuma Asami and Honoka and singer-actress Aya Sugimoto. Aoi plays the character "Nozomi Ichimonji" in the manga-based series about a ronin student moving to Tokyo and sharing a house with several beautiful women. She was also cast in the TV Asahi midnight drama  which aired from July to September 2006, and in late 2007 she was a guest star on the popular J-dorama detective show Galileo (ガリレオ).

International celebrity 
Aoi remained at S1, but her work in adult videos became irregular after mid-2006. One of her S1 videos, Hyper Risky Mosaic – Special Bath House Tsubaki, with 11 other S1 actresses won the First Place Award at the 2007 AV Open contest. In July 2011, S1 released a new work, Mega Semem Bukkake Facial, but since then the studio has only published compilation videos for Aoi through late 2013. The major Japanese adult video distributor DMM held a poll of its customers in late 2012 to choose the 100 all-time best AV actresses to celebrate the 30th anniversary of adult videos in Japan. Aoi was voted into 53rd place in the balloting.

As a singer, Aoi put out a CD in 2006 titled "Hadaka no Kiss". She was a member of the first generation Ebisu Muscats between 2008 and 2013.

Aoi traveled to Thailand for a part in a mainstream Thai teen movie, Hormones (Pid Term Yai, Hua Jai Waa Wun), released in March 2008. She plays a Japanese tourist who brings one character to the brink of infidelity to his girlfriend. Hormones won the Jury's Special Prize at the fourth Asian Marine Film Festival in Japan which journalist Wise Kwai ascribed to Aoi's presence.

Aoi made her debut in another Asian entertainment market when she appeared in a Korean TV drama Korean Classroom in May 2009. The four-part series follows three Japanese girls traveling to Korea and co-stars fellow AV Idols Mihiro and Rio. Aoi was subsequently scheduled to appear on several Korean variety shows while in Korea to promote the series. Back in Japan, Aoi starred as a zombie-killing stripper in director Takao Nakano's May 2010 comedy horror film Big Tits Zombie, a film adaption of the cult manga Kyonyū Dragon. Later that year Aoi was in Hong Kong starring in the erotic thriller Revenge: A Love Story which reached theaters in December 2010.

In late April 2010, Aoi's Twitter account was discovered by many Chinese netizens, despite the social networking site's typically being inaccessible in China. Fans of the AV model began distributing software allowing them to bypass the censorship of Twitter. Following the 2010 Yushu earthquake in China's Qinghai Province, Sola Aoi announced that she would raise funds to donate to the earthquake victims. This was received by a mixed response by Chinese netizens, with some praising her help and others finding it unseemly. In November 2010, she opened a microblog on Sina Weibo, China's most popular domestic microblog service,  posting in Japanese, English, and Chinese. In her first six hours on Sina Webo, she attracted 130,000 followers and by September 2012 that figure had risen to more than 13 million. Her sizable following in China has also led to her debut as a singer in Mandarin Chinese with the song "mao yi" (毛衣 or Sweater) which was released digitally for mobile phone and computer download.

In April 2011, Aoi had a starring role in the Indonesian horror movie Suster Keramas 2 (Shampooing or Evil Nurse 2), making her the third Japanese AV actress to appear in Indonesian films recently. (The others being Rin Sakuragi in the original Suster Keramas and Maria Ozawa, known in Indonesia as "Miyabi", in the 2009 film Kidnapping Miyabi.) The earlier films, although very successful, engendered protests from conservative Muslim groups in Indonesia, so Aoi's trip to Indonesia and participation in the film were kept secret. Aoi said that working in Indonesia gave her pause but she wanted to expand her mainstream career and that she was "really looking forward to coming into contact with foreigners and engaging in communication."

Aoi retired from the AV industry around 2011 with her last original AV being Sora Aoi Mega Cum Facials, directed by Hasumi Kuka and released on June 7, 2011. S1 also released several omnibus compilations over the next few years including a 3-disk, 12 hour long compilation titled All 97 Production S1 12 Hours Sora Aoi Complete BEST which compiled scenes from every film she's done with the studio. In 2019, distribution of her AV work has been discontinued from the Japanese e-commerce retailer FANZA (formerly known as DMM.com) and her profile from S1's website has also been deleted. In a blog post Aoi revealed that she herself requested this action due to her pregnancy and new family life: "By halting sales, I do not want to erase the past,” Aoi added in the blog post. “But I also do not want to do nothing. I can not erase the past even if wanted to erase it. I stopped selling the official titles. But illegal versions are scattered about the internet if one looks.”

Aoi's high profile in China has also led to controversy, exemplified by the taunts and insults directed towards her because of her plea in September 2012 for a peaceful solution to the Senkaku Islands dispute between Japan and China. In May 2013, a "culture war" ensued when a work of calligraphy created by Aoi as a guest promoting a theme park in Ningbo, China in April 2013 was reportedly auctioned for $95,000. A government-backed newspaper called the calligraphy "childish", her fans supported her, and many considered the auction simply a publicity stunt by the theme park.

On May 5, 2012, it was reported that Aoi would be debuting in South Korea as a singer and actress and would be cast in a future Korean movie, titled Vacance. She continued to work as an actress in small roles including a small cameo appearance in the Chinese sex comedy Naked Ambition 2. She also appeared in the 2014 Thai romantic comedy Ai Fai.. Thank You Love You.

On January 3, 2018, Aoi announced her marriage to musician DJ Non and on December 12, 2018 she announced pregnancy with her first child. On May 1, 2019, Aoi gave birth to twin boys.

Collaboration Brands 
In 2022, Sola Aoi was named as the WE88 Global Brand Ambassador for 2022/23 to promote and boost the brand’s presence across Asia. 

In December 2022, Sola Aoi collaborated with a Malaysian rapper, singer, songwriter, filmmaker and actor Namewee as the main female lead in a music video, "Someone Else's Wife" (Chinese: 別人的老婆).

Filmography

TV drama

V-Cinema

Theatrical releases

References

Bibliography

External links 

 
 
 
 Jacobs, Katrien: "Potency and Protest on the Chinese Internet", Berfrois, 26 January 2012

 
|-
! colspan="3" style="background: #DAA520;" | Pinky Ribbon Awards
|-

Living people
1983 births
Actresses from Tokyo
Ebisu Muscats
Japanese gravure models
Japanese pornographic film actresses
Japanese television personalities
Pink film actors